Scenes is the second studio album by guitarist Marty Friedman, released on November 17, 1992 through Shrapnel Records (United States) and Roadrunner Records (Europe). It is a notable stylistic departure from Friedman's first album, Dragon's Kiss (1988), as well as his heavier work with Cacophony and Megadeth, in that it predominantly features mellow, clean-tone playing instead of his usual distortion. The final track, "Triumph", is a remake of "Thunder March" from Dragon's Kiss. The album also features then-Megadeth bandmate Nick Menza on drums.

Critical reception

Robert Taylor at AllMusic gave Scenes three stars out of five, saying that "This recording marked the true arrival of one of the most important and original guitarists to emerge from the neo-classical genre", and that it "revealed a level of depth and maturity that equally surprised Megadeth and guitar-shred fans everywhere." In addition to Friedman's work, the production by Kitarō and keyboards by Brian BecVar were also heavily praised.

Track listing

Personnel
Marty Friedman – guitar, bass, production
Brian BecVar – keyboard, percussion
Nick Menza – drums
Steve Fontano – engineering, mixing, production
Kitarō – engineering, mixing, production
Mike Stock – engineering
Dary Sulich – engineering
Sir John – engineering
Gordon Sutcliffe – engineering
Kenneth K. Lee, Jr. – mastering

References

External links
In Review: Marty Friedman "Scenes" at Guitar Nine Records

Marty Friedman albums
1992 albums
Shrapnel Records albums
Roadrunner Records albums
Albums recorded in a home studio